Alessandro Zaffonato (active 1730) was an Italian engraver of the late Baroque period. He engraved Raphael's Judgment of Solomon and a few other plates.

References

Italian engravers
18th-century deaths
Year of birth unknown